State Road 810 (SR 810), locally known as Hillsboro Boulevard, is an east–west street serving northern Broward County, Florida. The western terminus of SR 810 is an intersection with U.S. Route 441 (US 441) and SR 7 on the city line between Coconut Creek and Parkland, and the eastern terminus is at an intersection with Ocean Drive (SR A1A) in Deerfield Beach. Within Deerfield Beach, Hillsboro Boulevard forms the axis separating the north and south sections of the street numbering system. The road is within one mile (1.6 km) south of neighboring Palm Beach County throughout its entire route.

Route description

SR 810 begins at the intersection between Hillsboro Boulevard and US 441–SR 7 on the border between Parkland and Coconut Creek, with SR 810 heading east into Coconut Creek. To the west, Hillsboro Boulevard continues west for approximately  without a state designation to an intersection with Parkside Drive. SR 810 proceeds east into Deerfield Beach, which features shopping centers alternating with mobile home parks, with the occasional park land and golf courses along the highway. It meets Interstate 95 (I-95 and SR 9) at a partial cloverleaf interchange. At Dixie Highway, the road crosses the Florida East Coast Railway tracks that carry the Brightline service. This is also the site of a proposed Tri-Rail station. SR 810 eventually ends at Ocean Drive (SR A1A) in downtown Deerfield Beach. Hillsboro Boulevard continues one block east of SR A1A as an un-numbered local street for one block, terminating at SE 21st Avenue, which provides parking for the beach.

Major intersections

See also

 List of state highways in Florida

References

External links

810
810